The Halliwell Jones Stadium is a rugby league stadium in Warrington, England, which is the home ground of the Warrington Wolves. It has also staged Challenge Cup semi-finals, the European Nations Final, the National League Grand Finals' Day, two games of the 2013 Rugby League World Cup and four games of the 2021 Rugby League World Cup. It is the 62nd largest stadium in England.

History

1990s-2004: Origins and Construction
By the late 1990s, Warrington's Wilderspool Stadium had become decrepit and unfit for purpose, and so the club looked to move to a new stadium. Before settling on a site just north of the town centre, which had formerly housed the Tetley Walker brewery, a site in Burtonwood was considered but these plans were rejected.

Ground was broke at the new site in 2002 and bucked the common trend of modern stadia by including terracing areas rather than being an all-seater stadium, with the South and West stands both containing terracing It also has enormous pitch dimensions of 120 m x 74 m, as requested by Warrington's head coach of the time, Paul Cullen, due to his desire to play expansive rugby. The stadium officially opened in 2004.

2011-present: Expansion
During the 2010 Championship Grand Final between Featherstone Rovers and Halifax, a fire beneath the terraced West Stand broke out, forcing all of the fans housed in the stand to be evacuated onto the field, holding up the game for around 45 minutes. Following a safety inspection the spectators were eventually allowed back in. However, when the smell of smoke failed to disperse, there was a further hold up as the fans were moved to the East Stand. The game resumed with no further interruptions. The fire is being treated as arson.

On 3 March 2011, the club announced that the corners of the East Stand at the stadium would be filled in to create a further 2,000 spaces made up of seating and terracing for the 2012 season. The stadium capacity, set at 15,000 for the first sell-out home match against St. Helens in 2012, was increased to 15,200 and can grow to 15,693 as the club proves it can handle the bigger crowds and get extra safety certificates. The club has also announced plans to increase the stadium's capacity to around 22,000 should the need arise. The largest ever crowd at the Halliwell Jones was in a 28–10 victory for Warrington Wolves over Widnes Vikings in the Super League on 25 March 2016 when 15,008 were in attendance.

Brian Bevan monuments 

Two monuments to Australian winger and world record try scorer Brian Bevan, who played for Warrington 1945–62 (scoring 740 tries for the Wire), are featured at the stadium. One, a statue of him, had previously been placed in the middle of a roundabout (known as Brian Bevan island) close to Wolves' old Wilderspool ground. This was moved to the Halliwell Jones Stadium with the team. The other, a mural showing Bevan's face made from 'Primrose and Blue' bricks, the traditional Warrington colours was created specifically for the location.

Two other tributes to ex-players at the ground are the naming of the South-East quadrant the Jack Fish corner, and the road the stadium is on Mike Gregory Way.

Layout

North Stand
The North Stand is the main stand of the ground, housing hospitality, changing rooms and dugout.

East Stand

The East Stand is situated behind the goal posts and is an all seater stand with hospitality boxes. In 2011, the corners next to the stand were filled in to increase the capacity.

South Stand
The South Stand runs along the side of the pitch and is terraced. It also houses the scoreboard and TV gauntry.

West Stand
The West Stand is terraced and houses the away fans. Unlike the East Stand at the opposite end of the ground, the corners are not filled in but there are future plans to do so if there is demand for the capacity to be increased.

Sponsorship 
Halliwell Jones, which holds the naming rights for the stadium, is a large BMW and MINI motor group owned by Phillip Jones, a businessman from the North West.

Usage

Rugby League
The stadium was primarily built as a rugby league venue and to be home of Warrington Wolves. 
It has also been used as a neutral venue on multiple occasions, the first being the Challenge Cup Semi Finals since it opened in 2004:

After successfully hosting its first Challenge Cup semi final in 2004, the ground was also selected to hold the Championship Grand Final on five separate occasions between 2006 and 2011.

It 2015, Warrington were chosen to play in the inaugural World Club Series. The club chose to host the game at the Halliwell Jones rather than move it to a bigger venue.

The Halliwell Jones has also been a venue for international rugby league, hosting a European Cup and World Cup.

Association football
The Halliwell Jones was chosen as one of the venues to host the Women's 2005 Euro Championship. In 2007, Liverpool chose the stadium to host their reserve team, who played there until 2009.
Liverpool Reserves (2007–09)
Women's 2005 Euro Championship

Non sporting events
The Halliwell Jones held the Autumn Pops Concert with Three Sporting Tenors. In 2010, the ground was used to film an episode of Candy Cabs which aired in April 2011 on BBC One.

References

External links 

Halliwell Jones on Worldstadia.com

Warrington Wolves
Buildings and structures in Warrington
Rugby league stadiums in England
Rugby League World Cup stadiums